Sega is a video game developer, publisher, and hardware development company headquartered in Tokyo, Japan, with multiple offices around the world. The company's involvement in the arcade game industry began as a Japan-based distributor of coin-operated machines, including pinball games and jukeboxes. Sega imported second-hand machines that required frequent maintenance. This necessitated the construction of replacement guns, flippers, and other parts for the machines. According to former Sega director Akira Nagai, this is what led to the company into developing their own games.

Sega released Pong-Tron, its first video-based game, in 1973. The company prospered from the arcade game boom of the late 1970s, with revenues climbing to over  million by 1979.  Nagai has stated that Hang-On and Out Run helped to pull the arcade game market out of the 1983 downturn and created new genres of video games.

In terms of arcades, Sega is the world's most prolific arcade game producer, having developed more than 500 games, 70 franchises, and 20 arcade system boards since 1981. It has been recognized by Guinness World Records for this achievement. The following list comprises the various arcade system boards developed and used by Sega in their arcade games.

Arcade system boards

Additional arcade hardware 
Sega has developed and released additional arcade games that use technology other than their dedicated arcade system boards.  The first arcade game manufactured by Sega was Periscope, an electromechanical game.  This was followed by Missile in 1969.  Subsequent video-based games such as Pong-Tron (1973), Fonz (1976), and Monaco GP (1979) used discrete logic boards without a CPU microprocessor.  Frogger (1981) used a system powered by two Z80 CPU microprocessors.  Some titles, such as Zaxxon (1982) were developed externally from Sega, a practice that was not uncommon at the time.

See also
Sega R360
List of game engines
List of Sega video game consoles

References

Sega
 
Sega arcade system boards